Isleño Spanish (Spanish:) is a dialect of the Spanish language spoken by the descendants of Canary Islanders who settled in St. Bernard Parish, Louisiana, United States, during the late 18th century. It has been greatly influenced by adjacent language communities as well as immigration from peninsular Spain and other Spanish-speaking countries. Moreover, the dialect spoken by the Isleños who settled along Bayou Lafourche is differentiated as Brule Spanish.

In the present day, Isleño Spanish is approaching complete extinction. Throughout the 20th century, modernization and urbanization came to disrupt greatly the transmission of Spanish, coupled with the hardships of natural disasters. The remaining Spanish speakers of the community tend to be elderly individuals from fishing communities of eastern St. Bernard Parish.

History 

The Isleños are descendants of colonists from the Canary Islands who arrived in Spanish Louisiana between 1778 and 1783. It estimated that about 2,000 Canary Islanders were settled into a series of communities, one of those coming to be known as San Bernardo (Saint Bernard).

Early in the establishment of this community, a minority of Acadians were present along with Filipinos from the nearby community of Saint Malo which intermarried with the Canary Islanders. In the nineteenth and twentieth centuries, the community was reinforced by immigration from rural, peninsular Spanish regions such as Andalusia, Santander, Galicia, and Catalonia. A survey conducted in 1850 found at least 63 natives of Spain, 7 Canary Islanders, 7 Cubans, and 7 Mexicans in the community.

Decline 
The 1915 New Orleans hurricane destroyed much of the Isleño fishing communities situated in eastern St. Bernard Parish. Only a couple years later, the Spanish flu pandemic left over one thousand people dead in the community. With the adoption of the Louisiana Constitution of 1921, public education was required to be conducted in English.

After World War II, urbanization and modernization played a greater effect on the community and the retention of Spanish. This was compounded by Hurricane Betsy which severely damaged much of Isleño community and presence in St. Bernard Parish. In 2005, Hurricane Katrina devastated the community and only a fraction of Isleño families have returned to their original communities.

Currently, the transmission of Spanish has halted completely along with the preservation of many traditions. Those who know Isleño Spanish or speak the dialect as a first language are often elderly community members.

Phonology 
In many respects, Isleño Spanish shares an array of similarities with other Spanish dialects, generally of the Canary Islands, mainland Spain, and the Caribbean. Isleño Spanish merges the phonemes /θ/ and /s/ into the single phoneme /s/, a phenomenon known as seseo. At least until the mid twentieth century, Isleño Spanish speakers made a distinction between /ʎ/ and /ʝ/, which is still typical of rural speech in the Canaries, but later studies have suggested instability in this feature.

Some of the notable features regarding consonants are described below:

 /d/ often experiences deletion in its various forms. In its intervocalic position, /d/ is habitually elided:  [pe.ˈlu] 'hairy' or  [ˈmjeo] 'fear'. In word-final positions, /d/ is deleted and the final vowel becomes stressed such as in  [uh.ˈte] 'you'.
In all other positions, /g/ is weakened.
 /h/ is generally preserved as the aspirate [h] where /h/ derives from the Vulgar Latin /f/ like in  [ha.ˈsei̯] 'to do, to make'.
 /n/ largely preserved as [n] but [ŋ] is occasionally heard. However, the consonant cluster /jn/ results in the loss of /n/.
 /r/ remains an alveolar trill in its word-initial position or when written <rr>. Elsewhere, it can be realized as [l] at the end of a syllable so that  'seine' is often pronounced [ˈal.te] rather than [ˈaɾ.te]. With some speakers, this becomes [h] so that  'because' is pronounced [ˈpoh.ke]. Just like with /d/, in its word final position, /r/ is habitually deleted.
 /s/ is typically becomes the aspirate [h] but is preserved in intervocalic positions like  [loh ˈka.sah] 'the houses' and other instances.
 /x/ is pronounced [h] exclusively, which is common in the southern Spain, the Canary Islands, and throughout the Caribbean.

As for the vowels used in Isleño Spanish, there are a handful of differences to Standard Spanish. Additionally, the diphthong /ei/ is often pronounced as /ai/ in words like  [ˈsai̯h] 'six' or  [ˈrai̯] 'king' which can be found in the Canaries and rural Spain.

Morphology and syntax 
The grammatical gender of certain words in Isleño Spanish differs from that of other dialects. It has been suggested that these differences are due to the early influence of Portuguese on Canarian Spanish.

Pronouns are often used redundantly in Isleño Spanish, just as in Caribbean dialects, for phonological reasons and to maintain the distinction between subjects. Moreover, the pronouns  and  remain unknown in the community.

Vocabulary 
Contact with other groups and substantial immigration into the St. Bernard community has shaped their vocabulary to some extent. Some of the largest contributions have been made by English, Louisiana French, Louisiana Creole, regional dialects of Spanish, and the various Castilian languages. Additionally, several archaic terms deriving from Old Spanish have been preserved.

A handful of terms originating to the Guanche languages have continued to be used in Isleño Spanish. In particular, the word  is used to describe toasted cornmeal or flour which is nearly identical to its usage in the Canaries. Also present is  'nape of the neck', which is believed to come from the Guanches as well. 

1. The comparison of terms below uses the following abbreviations for different parts of speech: (n.) noun, (m.n.) masculine noun, (f.n.) feminine noun, (v.) verb, (adj.) adjective.

Brule Spanish 
The Isleños who settled in the community of Valenzuela along Bayou Lafourche were greatly influenced by the immigration of Acadian refugees and further isolation. The dialect has been considered an "offshoot" of Isleño Spanish and is referred to as Brule Spanish. During the later half of the 20th century, the Isleños left these communities, leading to the dissolution of their speech community. Their dialect is highly endangered if not already extinct as only a few dozen octogenarian speakers were known to exist in the early 1990s.

The dialect possesses a large number of loanwords from Louisiana French which is seen as the main distinction between it and Isleño Spanish. Even so, an amount of similarities in vocabulary between Brule and Isleño Spanish exist:

1. The comparison of terms below uses the following abbreviations for different parts of speech: (n.) noun, (m.n.) masculine noun, (f.n.) feminine noun, (v.) verb, (adj.) adjective, (adv.) adverb.

Notable Isleño Spanish-speaking people 

 Frank Michael Fernández, Jr.
 Irván "Puco" Pérez

See also 

 Isleño (Louisiana)
 Canarian Spanish
 Caribbean Spanish
 Spanish in the United States
 Sabine River Spanish

References

Further reading 

 Holloway, Charles Edward (1993). The Death of a Dialect: Brule Spanish in Ascension Parish, Louisiana. LSU Historical Dissertations and Theses. pp. viii–ix, 43–45, 143. An extensive linguistic investigation of Brule Spanish.
 Lestrade, Patricia Manning (1999). Trajectories in Isleño Spanish with special emphasis on the lexicon. Tuscaloosa: University of Alabama. A lexical investigation of Isleño Spanish and a community survey.
 Lipski, John M (July 1, 1990). The Language of the Isleños: Vestigial Spanish in Louisiana. Baton Rouge and London: Louisiana State University Press. . A linguistic investigation highlighting defining characteristics of Isleño Spanish.
 MacCurdy, Raymond R (1950). The Spanish Dialect in St. Bernard Parish, Louisiana. Albuquerque The University of New Mexico Press. . Phonetic and phonological study of Isleño Spanish with a detailed lexicon.
 MacCurdy, Raymond R. (December 1959). "A Spanish Word-List of the "Brulis" Dwellers". Hispania. 42 (4): 547–554. . . A word list of Brule Spanish with its similarities to Isleño Spanish.

Endangered Romance languages
Isleño American
Louisiana (New Spain)
Spanish-American culture in Louisiana
Spanish language in the United States
Languages of the Caribbean
Minority languages
Endangered diaspora languages
Endangered languages of the United States
Spanish language in North America